An election to Londonderry Borough Council took place on Thursday 15 January 1920 as part of that year's Irish local elections.

As a result, Unionists lost control over Londonderry borough council, which for the first time passed into the control of the city's Catholic majority. The various Nationalist parties in the city contested the election on a pan-nationalist front, emphasizing the national question of Irish self-government, as well as issues over housing.

The Local Government (Ireland) Act 1919 had seen the introduction of a PR electoral system for local government elections in Ireland. Turnout was high, at 93.5%. Despite the new electoral system only 2.8% of ballots were spoiled. Whilst Unionists won nearly 60% of the popular vote, this was connected to the Nationalist dominated West Ward going uncontested.

Nationalist control of the council wouldn't last however, and following the partition of Ireland the Northern Irish Government restored the older, and less representative ward based system.

Results by party

North Ward
The Unionists put forward 7 candidates, and Nationalists 5. The Unionists gave instructions that their candidates should be voted for in alphabetical order. In the first round Unionist candidates 1,923 votes (59.72%), and Nationalists 1,297 (40.28%).

Waterside Ward
In Waterside ward 6 Unionists and 3 Nationalists were returned. Anderson and Bradley, topping the poll, were appointed as Aldermen. Unionists were advised to vote and allocate their preferences for Unionist candidates alphabetically.

South-East Ward

West Ward
The combined Sinn-Fein/Nationalist ticket put up 8 candidates for the 8 seats in the West Ward. The Unionist grouping in the city did not put up any candidates, resulting in there being no contest and the Sinn-Fein/Nationalist candidates being all successful.

References

Londonderry
Derry City Council elections